"Boogie Nights" is a 1977 single by international funk-disco group Heatwave. It was written by keyboardist Rod Temperton and was included on Heatwave's debut album, Too Hot to Handle. Harpist Carla Skanger (a pseudonym of Sheila Bromberg of the London Symphony Orchestra) played harp and American actor and singer Clarke Peters performed backing vocals on the recording.

History
The song became one of the best-known disco songs by a British group and charted at #2 on the UK Singles Chart. In the US, "Boogie Nights" also peaked at #2 on the Billboard Hot 100 behind "You Light Up My Life" by Debby Boone.  It  appeared on US Billboard R&B and dance charts during 1977. "Boogie Nights" reached #1 in New Zealand. The single was certified platinum by the Recording Industry Association of America (RIAA).

In the United Kingdom, the song was #2, and entered on March 5, 1977, only behind Leo Sayer with "When I Need You".

"Boogie Nights" has been covered many times by artists such as KC and the Sunshine Band, Will to Power, 911 and The Weather Girls. British boy-band Blue also performed the tune in their live shows.

The song made an appearance in the films Eyes of Laura Mars, Summer of Sam and The Stud, though it was not featured in the 1997 film titled after it: Boogie Nights. Apparently the group's lead singer, Johnnie Wilder Jr., a devout born-again Christian, refused to allow the use of the recording in the film because the song was about dancing, not pornography, while the film was about the latter.

Aaron Judge, right-fielder for the New York Yankees, famously uses the song as his walk-up.

Charts and certifications

Weekly charts

Year-end charts

Sales and certifications

Sonia version

In 1992, British singer Sonia recorded her take on the song, produced by Mark Taylor and Tracy Ackerman for her third studio album, Better the Devil You Know, in 1993. It was released in August 1992 and peaked at #30 on the UK Singles Chart in September. The single's B-side is "My Light", which also appears on the album.

Track listings
Cassette and 7-inch single
 "Boogie Nights" – 3:40
 "My Light" – 3:55

CD single
 "Boogie Nights" – 3:40
 "Boogie Nights" (extended mix) – 5:42
 "My Light" – 3:55

12-inch single
 "Boogie Nights" (extended mix) – 5:42
 "Boogie Nights" (dub mix)
 "My Light" – 3:55

References

External links
Heatwave U.S. 7" single release info at Discogs
 

1977 singles
1992 singles
Heatwave (band) songs
Will to Power (band) songs
Sonia (singer) songs
Number-one singles in New Zealand
Songs written by Rod Temperton
1976 songs
GTO Records singles
Songs about dancing
Songs about nights